This is a list of people who have served as Lord Lieutenant of East Lothian, or Haddingtonshire.

Thomas Hamilton, 6th Earl of Haddington, 1716 – 28 November 1735
George Hay, 7th Marquess of Tweeddale, 17 March 1794 – 9 August 1804
Charles Hamilton, 8th Earl of Haddington, 18 September 1804 – 1823
George Hay, 8th Marquess of Tweeddale, 10 February 1823 – 10 October 1876
George Baillie-Hamilton-Arden, 11th Earl of Haddington, 14 November 1876 – 11 June 1917
Hugo Charteris, 11th Earl of Wemyss, 25 January 1918 – 12 July 1937
Walter George Hepburne-Scott, 9th Lord Polwarth, 17 September 1937 – 1944
William Hay, 11th Marquess of Tweeddale, 17 August 1944 – 30 March 1967
David Charteris, 12th Earl of Wemyss, 21 June 1967 – 1987
Sir Hew Hamilton-Dalrymple, 10th Baronet, 26 January 1987 – 2001
Sir Garth Morrison, 30 July 2001 – 24 May 2013
Michael Williams, MBE, 21 February 2014 – 15 March 2021
Roderick Urquhart, 15 March 2021 – present

Related Records
 There are files relating to the activities of the Lord Lieutenancy held by East Lothian Council Archives.
 The Role of the East Lothian Lieutenancy
 Lord Polwarth

References

East Lothian
East Lothian
Lord-Lieutenants of East Lothian
Lordships of Parliament